Albert Park is a light rail station on the former  St Kilda line, located in the Melbourne suburb of Albert Park, Victoria. The station is located on Ferrars Street just to the north of Albert Road, just minutes walk from the Bob Jane Stadium, current home of the South Melbourne Soccer club and the former home of the South Melbourne Football Club. A pair of low level side platforms now serve route 96 trams on the light rail line.

History
Albert Park station opened in 1860, not long after the line though it was opened in 1857. It was originally known as Butts, being renamed to Albert Park in 1872. The station had a signal box on the citybound platform, which controlled the interlocked gates the Bridport Street level crossing, located at the Melbourne end of the station. An annett locked crossover also existed at the St Kilda end of the station between the two lines, being used by goods trains serving St Kilda station. The crossover was removed in 1959 when the goods service was withdrawn, and the signal box was abolished on 28 September 1960 when boom barriers were erected at the level crossing.

The St Kilda line was closed in 1987 and converted to light rail, with the route 96 tram now running through the former station. The last train service ran on 31 July 1987 with the light rail officially commissioned on 21 November in the same year. The high level platforms used by trains and the station buildings have been fenced off from public access and the up platform is now a café and a Victorian Railways antiquities museum.

Tram services
Yarra Trams operates one route via Albert Park station:
 : East Brunswick – St Kilda Beach

References

Disused railway stations in Melbourne
Railway stations in Australia opened in 1860
Railway stations closed in 1987
1987 disestablishments in Australia
Buildings and structures in the City of Port Phillip
Tram stops in Melbourne
Transport in the City of Port Phillip